Silk Stockings is a 1955 stage musical.

Silk Stockings may also refer to:

 Silk Stockings (1920 film), a silent film with Keene Thompson
 Silk Stockings (1927 film), an American comedy film
 Silk Stockings (1957 film), a film adaptation of the 1955 musical
 Stockings made of silk.

See also 
 Silk Stalkings, a 1990s American TV crime series
 Silk Stocking District, a former nickname for the Upper East Side of Manhattan, New York City
 Silk Stocking District (Talladega), a neighborhood on the National Register of Historic Places listings in Talladega County, Alabama
 Silk Stocking Sal, a 1924 film directed by Tod Browning